Alan Francis Pegler OBE, FRSA (16 April 1920 – 18 March 2012) was a British businessman, entrepreneur, and railway preservationist.

Early life
Born in London on 16 April 1920, he was the great grandson of Alfred Pegler, founder of the Northern Rubber Company based in Retford, and son of Francis Egerton Pegler. His mother Enid was the daughter of amateur golfer Frederick Schomberg Ireland, who was written about by Bernard Darwin in his book Green Memories. Raised in the Nottinghamshire village of Sutton cum Lound, he was educated at Hydneye House School, Sussex, and Radley College near Oxford. His uncle was Stephen Pegler.

Career
Pegler gained his Private Pilot Licence aged 17 at Radley, and spent much of his time chasing LNER expresses along the East Coast Main Line. Accepted into Jesus College, Cambridge, to study law, the outbreak of World War II meant that he was instead commissioned into the Fleet Air Arm, training to fly Blackburn Skua fighter/dive-bombers. However, a serious illness resulted in his being invalided out to join the Royal Observer Corps. Upset at not being assigned to active duty, he applied to become an intelligence officer for the Royal Air Force, where he accepted that, as his Fleet Air Arm commission was not recognised, he would have to start again in the ranks. By the end of World War II, he was again a commissioned officer in the RAF Photographic Recognition department.

Postwar he was again accepted into Jesus College, Cambridge, but after a year his father became ill, and he returned home to run the family business. Made a director of the firm aged 21, he then became a Lloyd's of London “name”, from which he earned a reasonable fortune of his own.

Railways
From 1951, Pegler began to run railway enthusiasts excursions, under the NRC banner. Through these efforts in 1955 he was directly appointed by Sir Brian Robertson to the British Transport Commission's Eastern area board.

Ffestiniog Railway

In 1951, Pegler was approached by friends to buy and clear the outstanding debt on the derelict Ffestiniog Railway, which having opened in 1832 ran from the slate quarries at Blaenau Ffestiniog  to the seaport town of Porthmadog. Lent £3,000 by his father, he obtained control in June 1954, and was appointed the company's Chairman. Preserved trains first ran over a short section in 1954, but after a diversion to avoid the new Ffestiniog Power Station reservoir, the line was fully reopened to passengers in 1982.

A few years later it was carrying 200,000 passengers, the second largest Welsh tourist attraction after Caernarvon Castle. Many saw this as the result of Pegler's drive and ability to inspire others with his unquenchable enthusiasm for fulfilling his dream. Pegler, who remained fully involved with the railway until his death in 2012, was appointed OBE in the 2006 New Year Honours in recognition of his contribution.

4472 "Flying Scotsman"

Pegler first saw LNER Class A3 4472 Flying Scotsman in Wembley at the 1924 British Empire Exhibition. In 1961, he received £70,000 for his share holding when Northern Rubber was sold to Pegler's Valves, a company started by his grandfather. In 1962, British Railways announced that they would scrap the Flying Scotsman. A group called "Save Our Scotsman" were unable to raise the £3,000 scrap value of the locomotive that would prevent this. Pegler stepped in and bought the locomotive outright, with the political support of Prime Minister Harold Wilson. He spent the next few years spending large amounts of money having the locomotive restored at the Doncaster Works, and then persuaded the British Railways Board to let him run enthusiasts' specials. The Flying Scotsman was at that time the only steam locomotive running on mainline British Railways.

In 1969, Prime Minister Wilson agreed to support Pegler via the Trade Department, running the locomotive in the United States and Canada to support British exports. To comply with American railway regulations, it was fitted with a cowcatcher, bell, buckeye couplers and an American-style chime whistle. Starting in Boston, Massachusetts, the tour ran into immediate problems, with some states seeing the locomotive as a fire hazard, and thereby raising costs through the need for diesel-headed-haulage through them. This was due to Edward Heath's Conservative Party ousted Wilson's Labour government, and withdrew financial support from the tour, which led Pegler to fund the tour himself during 1970. 

By the end of the Flying Scotsman tour in 1972, the money had run out and Pegler was declared bankrupt at a cost of £132,000 in debt, with the locomotive in storage in U.S. Army Sharpe Depot to keep it away from unpaid creditors. In 1973, in a rescue mission, the Flying Scotsman was sold to rail enthusiast Sir William McAlpine, who returned it to the UK.

Later life
Pegler worked his passage home from San Francisco to England on a P&O cruise ship in 1971, giving lectures about trains and travel. Declared bankrupt in the High Court 1972, he rented a room above a fish and chip shop opposite Paddington Station.

From 1973, Pegler was again employed by P&O for two seasons giving his popular lectures. He obtained a discharge from his bankruptcy in December 1974. Pegler then took up acting, gaining his Equity trade union card by playing Henry VIII in a theatre restaurant in St Katharine Docks. He also played 700 performances of Henry VIII at the Tower of London.

When Sir James Sherwood's Sea Containers company began collecting Pullman Company carriages to relaunch an Orient Express, Pegler introduced himself as a useful railway contact, as well as an expert lecturer. Sherwood employed Pegler as a lecturer six days a week, and when the trains were not running he performed the same role on British Rail's luxury Highland rail cruises.

Personal life
Pegler married four times:
Susan Bendell (1940 – unknown, divorced), with whom he had a son, Timothy
Lois Reith (1946–1948, her death)
Pamela Marshall (1952–1956, her death), with whom he had a daughter, Penny
Pauline Graves (1957–1970, divorced)

Pegler's partner for much of his later life was Petrina Derrington. He died on 18 March 2012 at the age of 91, after a short illness.

Final journey 
On 13 October 2018, his ashes were taken on board the Flying Scotsman for a journey from London King's Cross to York. As he had wished, they were scattered in the firebox as the train ascended Stoke Bank. His daughter Penny Vaudoyer was on the footplate.

Legacy 
Alan Pegler was known throughout the world for his contributions to the preservation movement, being famously involved with two of its greatest achievements: the saving of the complete Ffestiniog Railway, and of probably the world's most famous steam locomotive, Flying Scotsman. A man of some personal modesty, Alan's adventures with steam started young when in 1928, aged just 8, his father took him to see the Flying Scotsman on its first non stop run from London to Edinburgh. From that moment on he was 'hooked' on steam.

Notes

Alumni of Jesus College, Cambridge
Officers of the Order of the British Empire
British people associated with Heritage Railways
1920 births
2012 deaths
People educated at Radley College
Royal Air Force officers
Royal Air Force personnel of World War II
Businesspeople from London
Ffestiniog Railway
Fleet Air Arm personnel of World War II
Fleet Air Arm aviators
People of the Royal Observer Corps
20th-century English businesspeople